Klause is the name of the following persons

Annette Curtis Klause (born 1953), American author
Gert-Dietmar Klause (born 1945), former East German cross-country skier